Military Security Command of the Korean People's Army is the principal Counterintelligence agency of the Korean People's Army. As an abbreviation in Korean, it is also called as a guardian (bowi) (보위 사). The headquarters of the Military Security Command is in Longbuk-dong, Oseong area, Pyongyang. Its headquarters borders the Pyongyang Institute of Foreign Languages across a wall. In addition, several independent offices have been established in Pyongyang as branch offices.

History
When the People's Army was founded in February 1948, Military Security Command origins traces its history to the 'safety agency' created by the anti-terrorism organization. During the Korean War, the safety agency worked to find out spies and anti-revolutionary and reactionary elements in the People's Army. The safety agency caught the attention of Kim Il-sung when he captured the military coups in 56 and 68 and purged Kim Chang-bong (김창봉) and Heo Bong-hak (허봉학). As a result, the safety agency became independent of the National Security Agency (now the National Security Agency) and became a political security agency that independently functions as a counter-attack. In 70, the Political Safety Agency changed its name to the National Security Agency, and in 1996, it was promoted to the National Security Agency again.

The leader of the organization from the late 60s to the mid 70s was Tae Byeong-ryul, the first generation of revolution (currently the chief of the Korean War and the Memorial Hall for the Liberation of Korea). Until the mid-80s, General Han Young-ok (88 years old, former chief commissioner of the National Military Commission) took over, and after Lieutenant General Nam Nam-sun, Captain Won Woong-hee (former political officer of the Air Force and Anti-Air Command) from 1989 to the present, is the commander of the Military Security Command. Military Security Command remained under the State Security Department until 1995, but in December of that year, it absorbed the border guards under the National Security Agency and expanded and reorganized it into the Military Security Command.

Overview
While in most Communist countries, political officers were in charge of monitoring the inside of the military, but in North Korea, a guard station has been established separately. Comparing the duties of the military politics departments such as the General Political Affairs Bureau and the guard headquarters, the political departments mainly focus on publicity and incitement, while focusing on everyday partyness and loyalty evaluation. The Military Security Command place more emphasis on secret surveillance such as wiretapping. In addition, while the political department does not handle the tasks related to actual investigation / arrest, the guard headquarters also performs the role of investigation / arrest. 

The duties of the Military Scurity Command include:

Finding and arresting those who deny, oppose, criticize, and criticize Kim Il-sung and Kim Jong-il's ideology and disparity, or those who prepare and distribute anti-party, anti-state, and dissident documents in the military plan, and have relationships with North Koreans, overseas Koreans, and theirs. They also monitor and control. Unlawful organizations such as alumni associations and social gatherings and organizers are monitored and searched.
Conduct a counterintelligence mission to search for spies sent from foreign countries and their partners, and to independently monitor the officers of the embassy in North Korea and foreign military personnel visiting North Korea.
During the visit or inspection of Kim Jong-il's military unit, the escort command is divided and supported.
It is in charge of the resident registration business of the military, which manages the resident registration of military officers and elders and issues resident registration documents necessary for their children's college entrance exam or job placement.
It is responsible for monitoring the trend of soldiers and civilians in the border area and the vicinity of the ceasefire line and controlling and guarding the border and coast through the inspection and search of borders.
Employees evading military service and cutting off national / military goods are handled and general criminals such as murder, robbery, and theft are also partially processed.

The guard headquarters is set up in the form of a bureau directly under the Ministry of People's Armed Forces, and the Military Security Command commander has a similar position to the Director of General Political Bureau, the Chief of General Staff, the General Reconnaissance Directorate (朝鮮人民軍偵察総局), and the General Logistics Department. In the past, it seems that it was called by the names of the Political Security Bureau, the Political Security and Conservation Bureau, the Political Safety and Conservation Bureau.

Commanders
Won Ung-hui 1992-2003
Kim Won-hong - 2003-2009
Jo Kyong-chol - ~2009 - now

References

Korean People's Army Ground Force
North Korean intelligence agencies
Military units and formations of North Korea
Counterintelligence agencies
Military intelligence agencies